Captain V. Lakshmikantha Rao is a senior leader of the Indian regional political party Telangana Rashtra Samithi. He hails from the Brahmin community. He was with the party since its formation.

He was the choice of TRS KCR for the Rajya Sabha biennial polls. On 3 June 2016 he was declared elected unopposed along with D. Srinivas of the same party.

References

Telangana Rashtra Samithi politicians
Living people
Year of birth missing (living people)
Rajya Sabha members from Telangana